The Hammer of God is the second of Nelson DeMille's novels about NYPD Sergeant Joe Ryker. It was published in 1974 then republished in 1989 with Jack Cannon listed as the author.

1974 American novels
Novels by Nelson DeMille
Leisure Books books